Gagik Simonyan (born 21 August 1971), is a retired Armenian football midfielder and current manager. He has also 1 appearance for Armenia national team as a substitute in an away match against Wales.

Coaching career 
2011–2013 - assistant coach of Alashkert FC, 2013–2014 - assistant coach of Ulisses FC, 2014–2015 - interim coach of Ulisses FC, since 2015 - Head coach of Alashkert FC.

Arrest 
On 12 January 2016 Simonyan was arrested by the National Security Service of Armenia along with administrator, assistant coach and one of footballers of the club. He was accused of illegal betting.

References

External links

1971 births
Living people
Armenian footballers
Armenian football managers
Armenia international footballers
FC Ararat Yerevan players
Ulisses FC players
Armenian Premier League players
Association football midfielders
Ulisses FC managers
FC Ararat Yerevan managers